Mark Stephen Jermyn (born 16 April 1981) is a former professional footballer who played as a defender.

Career
Jermyn began his career as a trainee with Torquay United, making his league debut on 6 March 1999, as a substitute for Steve Tully in the 4–0 win at home to Halifax Town, while still a trainee. He turned professional in July 1999, but was released by manager Wes Saunders in February 2000 without adding to his single league appearance.

He joined Bideford in March 2000, but joined Dorchester Town in the following July. Since joining Dorchester he has been named the club's player of the year three times and has helped them to promotion from the Southern League Eastern Division and to consolidation in the Conference South.

After 11 years and 489 appearances, Jermyn was granted a testimonial match, which was played against Portsmouth on 2 August 2011.

Prior to the start of the 2014–15 Southern League Premier Division season, Jermyn signed for Poole Town.

After a spell with Poole Town, Jermyn returned to Dorchester Town as player-manager in January 2015. On 17 December 2016, it was confirmed, that Jermyn would leave the club at the new year.

Career statistics

References

External links

1981 births
Living people
People from Rinteln
English footballers
Torquay United F.C. players
Bideford A.F.C. players
Dorchester Town F.C. players
Association football midfielders
English Football League players
Poole Town F.C. players
Footballers from Lower Saxony